Corruption in Latvia is examined on this page.

Extent 
According to several sources, the Latvian political system faces serious corruption. The influence of private interests involved in illegal political party funding undermines the efforts to combat political corruption. According to Transparency International's Global Corruption Barometer 2013, 68% of surveyed households consider political parties to be corrupt or extremely corrupt—ranking as the most corrupt institution in Latvia. Furthermore, 55% of the surveyed households believe that the level of corruption has stayed the same and 67% of surveyed households find government efforts in the fight against corruption to be ineffective Transparency International's 2021 Corruption Perceptions Index scored Latvia at 59 on a scale from 0 ("highly corrupt") to 100 ("highly clean"). When ranked by score, Latvia ranked 36th among the 180 countries in the Index, where the country ranked first is perceived to have the most honest public sector.  For comparison, the best score was 88 (ranked 1), and the worst score was 11 (ranked 180).

There is a widespread perception that politicians and businesses are too closely linked in Latvia. Business executives surveyed in the World Economic Forum’s Global Competitiveness Report 2013-2014 believe that public funds are sometimes diverted to companies, individuals or groups due to corruption, and the lack of sufficient ethical behaviour of companies with public officials, politicians and other companies is a competitive disadvantage for the country.

Reaction
The leading specialised anti-corruption authority of Latvia is the Corruption Prevention and Combating Bureau (KNAB). It was established in October 2002, following  adoption of the Law on Corruption Prevention and Combating Bureau on 18 April 2002.

Since the start of 2020, the Whistleblowing law has entered force to promote whistleblowing on violations in public interests and ensure the establishment and operation of whistleblowing mechanisms, and also due protection of whistleblowers.

See also
 Police corruption in Latvia
 International Anti-Corruption Academy
 Group of States Against Corruption
 International Anti-Corruption Day
 ISO 37001 Anti-bribery management systems
 United Nations Convention against Corruption
 OECD Anti-Bribery Convention
 Transparency International

References

External links
Latvia Corruption Profile from the Business Anti-Corruption Portal

Latvia
Politics of Latvia
Crime in Latvia by type
Latvia